"Please Don't Turn Me On" is a song by UK garage duo Artful Dodger, released on 13 November 2000 as the fifth single from the duo's debut studio album, It's All About the Stragglers (2000). The song peaked at number four on the UK Singles Chart and spent 10 weeks on the chart. It also reached the top 50 in Australia and Ireland, as well as number 90 in Switzerland.

The song features singer Lifford (real name Lifford Shillingford), who would later appear as a contestant on the twelfth season of Britain's Got Talent.

Track listings

UK CD single
 "Please Don't Turn Me On" (radio edit)
 "R U Ready"
 "Please Don't Turn Me On" (UK garage remix)
 "Please Don't Turn Me On" (video)

UK 12-inch single
A1. "Please Don't Turn Me On" (Wideboys Oyster vocal mix)
B1. "Please Don't Turn Me On" (Erick Morillo's Disco Thang)
B2. "Please Don't Turn Me On" (Stanton Warriors Fabric vocal)

UK cassette single
 "Please Don't Turn Me On" (radio edit)
 "R U Ready"

Australian CD single
 "Please Don't Turn Me On" (radio edit)
 "Please Don't Turn Me On" (Wideboys Oyster vocal mix)
 "Please Don't Turn Me On" (Erick Morillo's Disco Thang)
 "Please Don't Turn Me On" (UK garage remix)

Charts

Certifications

References

2000 songs
2000 singles
Artful Dodger (duo) songs
FFRR Records singles
Songs about infidelity
Songs written by Conner Reeves
Songs written by Mark Hill (musician)